Siglo XX Cambalache was an Argentine TV program of Telefe, aired from 1992 to 1995. The name is part of the lyrics of the tango "Cambalache". It was hosted by Fernando Bravo and Teté Coustarot, who made interviews to several people. It had 19 rating points.

References

Argentine television talk shows
Telefe original programming
1992 Argentine television series debuts
1995 Argentine television series endings